Slowness (s) is a quantity introduced in Seismology which is the reciprocal of velocity. Thus travel time of a wave is the distance that the wave travels times the slowness of the medium ( in seismology, it refers to different layers of Earth exhibiting different densities)
Thus,

Slowness = 1/Velocity

If we divide the path followed by the ray into N segments numbered  i = 1, 2 .. N the total travel time of the wave is

Therefore, the residual travel time is due to departures in slowness experienced by the wave along the raypath.

Sonic well logs

Measurements of interval transit time, designated , made during wireline logging are used to determine sonic velocities of the wallrock in boreholes. The tool used has sources and receivers that are in contact with the wellbore and it measures the delay between the source being triggered and the signal being received. The measurements are normally in the units of microseconds per foot and are recorded on the well log.

References

External links 
 
 

Seismology
Velocity